Jorge Ruiz may refer to:

 Jorge Ruiz (field hockey) (born 1958), field hockey player from Argentina
 Jorge Armando Ruiz (born 1989), Colombian racewalker
 Jorge Ruiz (Venezuelan footballer) (born 1989), Venezuelan footballer
 Jorge Ruiz (Mexican footballer) (1928–2013), Mexican footballer
 Jorge Ruiz Cabestany (born 1956), Spanish racing cyclist
 Jorge Ruiz Ojeda (born 1995), Spanish footballer